Timeless is the thirty-fifth studio album by Bobby Vinton, released in 1989. Two singles came from this album: "It's Been One of Those Days" and "Please Tell Her That I Said Hello".

Track listing

Side 1
 "Please Tell Her That I Said Hello" - (Michael Shepstone, Peter Dibbens) - 3:29
 "The Only Fire That Burns" - (Bucky Jones, Johnny Russell) - 3:23
 "Ain't No Pleasin' You" - (Chas Hodges, Dave Peacock) - 3:57
 "The Last Rose" - (C.F. House) - 3:16
 "What Did You Do With Your Old 45s" - (Pam A. Hanna, George Pickard) - 3:55

Side 2
 "(Now and Then There's) A Fool Such as I" - (Bill Trader) - 2:34
 "How Old Do You Get" - (Peter McCann, Chip Young) - 3:09
 "Getting Used to Being Loved Again" - (Gene Dobbins, Glenn Ray) - 2:22
 "It's Been One of Those Days" - (Chester Lester, Tim DuBois, Mike Seals) - 3:02
 "I Made Love (With You Tonight)" - (Terry Skinner, J.L. Wallace, Tommy Rocco) - 3:02

Charts
Singles - Billboard (United States)

References

1989 albums
Bobby Vinton albums
Curb Records albums